Philam Garcia (born 5 February 1980) is a Guam sprinter. He competed in the men's 100 metres at the 2000 Summer Olympics.

References

External links
 

1980 births
Living people
Athletes (track and field) at the 2000 Summer Olympics
Guamanian male sprinters
Olympic track and field athletes of Guam
Place of birth missing (living people)